The Green Ice Rises are a local swelling of the Antarctic ice surface  east of Henderson Island, where the Shackleton Ice Shelf overrides an underlying obstruction. The feature was mapped by G.D. Blodgett (1955) from aerial photography taken by U.S. Navy Operation Highjump (1946–47), and was named by the Advisory Committee on Antarctic Names for Duane L. Green, a radio operator and recorder with U.S. Navy Operation Windmill parties which established astronomical control stations along Wilhelm II, Knox, and Budd coasts in January and February, 1948.

References

Ice rises of Antarctica
Bodies of ice of Queen Mary Land